Bacchisa violaceoapicalis is a species of beetle in the family Cerambycidae. It was described by Pic in 1923. It is known from Vietnam.

References

V
Beetles described in 1923